Lunularic acid is a dihydrostilbenoid found in the liverwort Lunularia cruciata and in the roots of Hydrangea macrophylla.

A lunularic acid decarboxylase has been detected from the liverwort Conocephalum conicum.

References 

Dihydrostilbenoids